Cendre is a 2007 studio album, a collaboration between Fennesz and Ryuichi Sakamoto. It follows their previous collaboration on 2005's Sala Santa Cecilia.

Track listing
All songs by Sakamoto and Fennesz.
 "Oto" – 3:49
 "Aware" – 4:46
 "Haru" – 4:39
 "Trace" – 5:46
 "Kuni" – 2:24
 "Mono" – 4:13
 "Kokoro" – 4:16
 "Cendre" – 3:09
 "Amorph" – 5:58
 "Glow" – 7:12
 "Abyss" – 5:38

Personnel
Sakamoto – piano, laptop
Fennesz – guitar, laptop
Jon Wozencroft – photography and cover design
Fernando Aponte – recording engineer
Kaz Tsujio – piano tuner
Denis Blackham – mastering @ Skye Mastering
Mixed by Ryuichi Sakamoto, Christian Fennesz, Fernando Aponte at KAB Studios NYC

References

2007 albums
Ryuichi Sakamoto albums
Fennesz albums
Collaborative albums
Touch Music albums